Ashraf ul Madaris (full name ) is an Islamic institution for Islamic studies located in Okara, Punjab, Pakistan.  It offers study from Matriculation level to master's degree. The school is affiliated with Tanzeem ul Madaris Ahle Sunnat Pakistan. whose degree is recognised by HEC equal to Master's. It is named after the 14th century Sufi saint Ashraf Jahangir Semnani. It was founded in 1954 by scholar and orator Ghulam Ali Okarvi.

Departments
 Department of Hifz (Memorization of the Qur'an)
 Department of Tajweed (Correct pronunciation of Qur'an)
 Department of Dars e Nizami (Islamic Studies)
 Department of Ifta (Issuing Verdicts of Islamic Law)

Alumni 
 Muhammad Shafee Okarvi
 Kaukab Noorani Okarvi

References

Islamic universities and colleges in Pakistan
Okara, Pakistan
Barelvi